Nikolai Lvovich Korovkin (born 29 December 1974) is a Russian football coach and a former player.

References

1974 births
Living people
Russian footballers
FC Chernomorets Novorossiysk players
Russian Premier League players
FC Moscow players
Association football midfielders
FC Torpedo Moscow players
FC Torpedo-2 players
FC Chertanovo Moscow players
FC FShM Torpedo Moscow players
FC MVD Rossii Moscow players